Mobility may refer to:

Social sciences and humanities
 Economic mobility, ability of individuals or families to improve their economic status
 Geographic mobility, the measure of how populations and goods move over time
 Mobilities, a contemporary paradigm in the social sciences and humanities that explores the movement of people, ideas and things
 Individual mobility
 Hypermobility (travel), the social aspects and environmental impacts of excessive travel
 Private transport, e.g., car-based
 Transport
 Sustainable transport, refers to the broad subject of transport that is or approaches being sustainable
 Active mobility (also known as soft mobility), based on non-motorized transportation methods
 Social mobility, movement of people between one social classes or economic levels

Arts, entertainment, and media
 Mobility (chess), the ability of a chess piece to move around the board and chess game 
 "Mobility" (song), a 1990 song by Moby
 Mobility (video game), a 2001 computer game

Computing and telecommunications
 Mobile computing, human–computer interaction by which a computer is expected to be transported during normal usage
 Mobility model, model of the motion of users of mobile phones and wireless ad hoc networks
 Personal mobility, the ability of telecommunication user to access services on the basis of a personal identifier

Education
 Academic mobility, students and teachers in higher education studying or teaching elsewhere for a limited time
 Apprentices mobility, students and teachers in vocational education, or training studying or teaching elsewhere for a limited time

Physics
 Electrical mobility, ability of charged particles to move through a medium
 Electron mobility, how quickly an electron can move through a metal or semiconductor
 Electrophoretic mobility, the velocity of a dispersed charged particle in electrophoresis

Other uses
 Mobility (military), the ability of military units or weapon systems to move to an objective
 Mobility Carsharing, car sharing cooperative of Switzerland
 Functional mobility, one of the basic activities of daily living (ADL) in the fields of health care and rehabilitation
 E-mobility known as electric vehicle (EV)

See also
 Flexibility (anatomy),  limberness, the range of movement in a joint or series of joints
 Logistics, the management of the flow of resources between points to meet some requirements
 Mobile (disambiguation)
 Mobility aid, a device designed to assist walking
 Mobilization, the act of assembling and making both troops and supplies ready for war
 Motility, a biological term which refers to the ability to move spontaneously and actively, consuming energy in the process
 Motion (physics), a change in position of an object with respect to time and its reference point